Pterotrachea hippocampus is a species of marine gastropod in the family Pterotracheidae.

References 

 Bonnevie K. (1920). Heteropoda. Report on the scientific results of the "Michael Sars" North Atlantic deep-sea expedition 1910 3(2) Zoology: 1-69, pl. 1-9

External links
 Philippi, R. A. (1836). Enumeratio molluscorum Siciliae cum viventium tum in tellure tertiaria fossilium, quae in itinere suo observavit. Vol. 1. I-XIV, 1-303, Tab. XIII-XXVIII. Schropp, Berlin
 Lesueur C.A. (1817). Description of six new species of the genus Firola, observed by Messrs. Le Sueur and Peron in the Mediterranean Sea, in the months of March and April, 1809. Journal of the Academy of Natural Sciences of Philadelphia. 1: 3-8.
 Oken, L. (1815-1816). Lehrbuch der Naturgeschichte. Dritter Theil: Zoologie. Erste Abtheilung: Fleischlose Thiere. Leipzig: C.H. Reclam & Jena: A. Schmid. xxviii + 842 pp. + xviii, 40 pls., 
 Chamisso Adelbertus de & Eysenhardt Carolus Guilelmus (1821). De animalibus quibusdam e classe vermium Linneana, in circumnavigatione Terrae, auspicante Comite N. Romanoff, duce Ottone di Kotzebue, annis 1815-1818 peracta, observatis Fasciculus secundus, reliquos vermes continens. Nova Acta physico-medica Academiae Cesareae Leopoldino-Carolinae 10: 343-373, Plates 24 to 33
 Vayssière, A. (1904). Mollusque hétéropodes provenant des campagnes des yachts Hirondelle et Princesse Alice. Résultats des campagnes scientifiques accomplies sur son yacht par Albert 1er, Prince souverain de Monaco. 26: 3-65 pl. 1-6
 Gofas, S.; Le Renard, J.; Bouchet, P. (2001). Mollusca. in: Costello, M.J. et al. (eds), European Register of Marine Species: a check-list of the marine species in Europe and a bibliography of guides to their identification. Patrimoines Naturels. 50: 180-213

Pterotracheidae
Animals described in 1836